USS Bienville was a  (burden) wooden side-wheel paddle steamer acquired by the Union Navy early in the American Civil War. She was armed with heavy guns and assigned to the Union blockade of the waterways of the Confederate States of America.

Built in Brooklyn, New York
Bienville built at Brooklyn, New York in 1860. She was a two-masted sail-steamer, with a walking beam steam engine driving a pair of side paddle wheels. The Union Navy bought her in August 1861 as part of the great expansion that took place in the first months of the American Civil War.

Civil War operations

Assigned to the South Atlantic blockade
She was commissioned in October 1861 and soon took part in the expedition that seized future Naval bases at Port Royal and Beaufort, South Carolina. Bienville operated off the Confederacy's Atlantic coast for more than a year, taking part in the capture of positions along the Georgia and Florida shore as well as ending the careers of several blockade runners, among them the steamships Stettin (later ) (taken on May 24, 1862) and Patras (May 27, 1862).

Gulf of Mexico operations

In 1863 USS Bienville was transferred to the Gulf of Mexico, where she continued her blockading work. She supported the capture of the entrances to Mobile Bay, Alabama on August 5, 1864. The USS Princess Royal and Bienville were stationed off the coast of Texas blockading Galveston. On the night of February 7, 1865, the two gunboats sent a boat party into Galveston Bay, Texas to seize two schooners loaded with cotton. The actual prize sought was the destruction of Wren, a ship built by Laird, Son & Co. of Birkenhead (no. 317), along with sister ship (no. 318) the Lark, for Fraser, Trenholm and Company. The Wren had run aground February 6, 1865, but was freed, narrowly escaping capture, and moored inside Galveston Harbor. The schooners Pet, with 256 bales of cotton on board, and Annie Sophia, with 220 bales, were anchored near the main channel at Fort Point. Acting Ensign George French was dispatched with twenty seamen and three officers to destroy the Wren and capture the schooners. Successful in capturing the schooners, they were not able to get to the Wren.

Decommissioning and civilian career
Bienville was decommissioned soon after the end of the Civil War. After about two years in reserve, she was sold in October 1867. She operated under the same name as a commercial steamship until August 15, 1872, when a fire destroyed her at Watling Island, Bahamas.

References

External links
USS Bienville (1861–1867)

1860 ships
American Civil War patrol vessels of the United States
Gunboats of the United States Navy
Ships built in Brooklyn
Ships built by Lawrence & Foulks
Ships of the Union Navy
Steamships of the United States Navy